Archibald Murdoch Gourlay (born 29 June 1969 in Scotland) is a Scottish retired footballer.

Career

Gourlay started his career with Greenock Morton, where he was touted to have a successful career.

In 1988, Gourlay signed for Newcastle United in the English top flight. Despite earning Man of the Match in his second appearance, a 0-2 League Cup loss to Middlesbrough, he never established himself in the first team, only making 5 appearances for the club. After that, Gourlay returned to Scotland with Motherwell before playing for English lower league sides Preston North End as well as Hartlepool United, where he only made 1 appearance.

References

External links
 Archie Gourlay at Soccer Base

Scottish footballers
Living people
1969 births
Association football forwards
Association football midfielders
Newcastle United F.C. players
Motherwell F.C. players
Preston North End F.C. players
Hartlepool United F.C. players
Greenock Morton F.C. players